Matthew Andrew Cristopher Wright (born February 7, 1991) is a Filipino-Canadian professional basketball player for Kyoto Hannaryz of the Japanese B.League. He played college basketball at St. Bonaventure University. He has since become an ABL champion and one of the most popular players and most clutch players in the Philippines.

High school and college career 
Wright played for the Scadding Court AAU basketball program in his teen years. He also played at the Martingrove Collegiate Institute, leading them in scoring with 21 points a game. He did consider committing to the La Salle Green Archers in the Philippines before his final year of high school.

Wright then played for the St. Bonaventure Bonnies after getting no scholarship offers from other schools. In his first season, he scored 18 points against the George Washington Colonials.

In his sophomore season, he hit a game-winning three pointer from the corner off a pass from teammate Andrew Nicholson against the St. Joseph’s Hawks. Behind Nicholson, the Bonnies won the Atlantic 10 championship that year. They also made it to the 2012 NCAA tournament, where they lost to Florida State.

In his junior season, Wright had 22 points on eight-of-eleven shooting including four-of-four behind the arc when the Bonnies beat the Temple Owls. He followed that with an 18-point night in SBU’s triumph over the Hawks. He also struggled through a torn plantar fascia during this time.

In his senior season, Wright had a college career-high 27 points on 10 of 14 shooting in a win against Canisius, which gave the Bonnies a 3–0 start to their season. The Bonnies then started A10 play with him scoring 20 points in a win over the Richmond Spiders. He then had 18 points against Fordham, then had 24 points against George Mason, which were both wins. He also got a cut below his right eye that required two stitches after the game. For those performances, he was named Atlantic 10 Co-Player of the Week along with Richmond guard Kendall Anthony. He then had 22 points on 8 of 15 shooting including 5 of 8 behind the arc in a win against the St. Louis Billikens. For that season, he led St. Bonaventure in scoring with 16.3 points per game. Aside from finishing in the top 10 for scoring in the Atlantic 10 conference, he also finished in the top 10 for assists, three-pointers made, minutes played, and free throw percentage (which he led the entire conference). He graduated with a degree in history.

Professional career

UJAP Quimper 29 (2014–2015)
After he had graduated, he signed a professional contract to play for the French club Quimper. This made him the 15th St. Bonaventure men’s basketball alumnus to sign a professional contract since Mark Schmidt became the Bonnies’ head coach in 2007. He made his debut in a 91–87 loss to Cognac on October 25, 2014. He did not score but he dished out three assists in 14 minutes of action.

Westports Malaysia Dragons (2015–2016)
On November 7, 2015, Wright recorded 30 points, 4 rebounds, 3 assists and 6 3-pointers made in a 100–92 win over the Saigon Heat. In the 2015–16 ABL season, Wright was named as the ASEAN Heritage MVP after he helped lead the Westports Malaysia Dragons to the finals of the ASEAN Basketball League on his maiden season with an average of 23.1 points, 4.2 rebounds and 3.4 assists per game.

Mighty Sports (2016)
On September 16, 2016, it was reported that he was going to be part of the Mighty Sports lineup for the 2016 Merlion Cup. In the team's second game on the group stages, he scored 20 points against Westports Malaysia Dragons to help the team get a semifinals berth. Mighty Sports eventually lost to the Shanghai Sharks in the finals of the 2016 Merlion Cup after Jimmer Fredette was fouled in the final possession taking a triple who then drained the 3 free throws.

Phoenix Fuel Masters (2016–2022)

2016–17 season: Rookie season 
Coach Chot Reyes committed all the players of the Gilas pool to the PBA draft, including Wright. He reunited with Ariel Vanguardia who was his coach when he played for the Westports Malaysia Dragons, after he was selected by the Phoenix Fuel Masters as their Gilas draft selection in the 2016 PBA draft. On November 8, 2016, he signed a 3-year, P8.5M rookie max deal with Phoenix. Due to food poisoning he missed the team's first game of the 2016-17 PBA Philippine Cup where they lost 94–87 to Blackwater Elite.  In his PBA debut, he scored 14 points to help his team have an upset win against the San Miguel Beermen. Against the Meralco Bolts, he had 22 points, including crucial free throws, that sealed the win for Phoenix. He then had a near triple-double of 12 points, 12 rebounds, and 9 assists in a win over the NLEX Road Warriors. He then followed it up by scoring 18 points in the second half to take a win against Barangay Ginebra. For those performances, he was given his first Player of the Week award. In his first All-Star Game, he received co-MVP honors along with Troy Rosario of the opposing side. That week, he also competed in his first three-point contest and won another All-Star Game MVP. He scored 27 points in a rematch with Ginebra in the Commissioner's Cup, taking the win over them. But they failed to qualify for the playoffs, as they lost to NLEX despite him scoring a career-high 42 points, the most by a rookie since Eric Menk in 1999. In the 2017 Governors' Cup, he struggled, as Phoenix failed to win games. He had 36 points against the Rain or Shine Elasto Painters, but they still got their eighth straight loss, a franchise-worst. He finished the season on the All-Rookie Team.

2017–18 season 
After starting the 2017–18 Philippine Cup with a loss, Phoenix went on to win two straight, with Wright scoring 13 of his 19 points against NLEX for that second straight win. On his 27th birthday, he scored a game-high 16 points, 5 rebounds, and made the game-winning assist to Doug Kramer against the TNT Katropa. He scored 32 points against the Globalport Batang Pier to secure the final spot in the playoffs for Phoenix. But they were eliminated by the Katropa. This loss gave him more rest after spending time between Phoenix and national team duties. In the Commissioner's Cup, he finished off a comeback from down sixteen against the Philippine Cup finalists Magnolia Hotshots by making a step-back three with 3.2 seconds remaining. He finished the game with 19 points on 7-of-14 shooting. In a double-overtime win over Ginebra, he made back-to-back scores in the second overtime that sealed the win for Phoenix. He finished that game with 19 points, 10 rebounds, three assists, one steal, and no turnovers in 44 minutes. During the 2018 All-Star Week, he once again played in the All-Star Game and competed in the three-point contest. In an overtime game against the Bolts, he had 28 points and six assists, but missed a jumper that could have won the game for them in overtime. In a win against Globalport, he had 24 points on six threes, but received a technical foul after retaliating from a hit to his head from opposing import Malcolm White. In the Governors' Cup, they finished with a franchise-best record of 8–3 record, gaining a twice-to-beat advantage and second place finish in the standings. He had 23 points in their last win. But they lost in the first round to the seventh-seeded Bolts. He finished the season third in the league in scoring with 17.6 points per game.

2019 season 
Before the start of the 2019 PBA season, Wright was awarded a three-year contract extension. He was also awarded a spot on the Second Mythical Team for the previous season. In a Philippine Cup match versus the Katropa, he scored 23 points (with seven coming in the overtime period) to lead the Fuel Masters to their second straight overtime win. He had 25 points in a win over the Beermen that secured the top seed for the Fuel Masters. They then beat the Alaska Aces to advance to the semifinals for the first time in franchise history. In the semifinals, they lost their first two games to the Beermen, as their playoff inexperience started to show. But in Game 3, he hit four crucial free throws despite battling bronchitis to give Phoenix the win. However, he received a flagrant foul for hitting Beermen guard Von Pessumal. The Beermen went on to win the next two games, eliminating the Fuel Masters from the playoffs. In the Commissioner's Cup, Phoenix had three straight losses with Coach Louie Alas and Calvin Abueva suspended. They also lost import Rob Dozier to a foot injury. He scored 28 points to lead Phoenix to a win over NorthPort and stop their win streak. In a comeback win against Ginebra, he combined with replacement import Richard Howell for 27 points in the third quarter. He finished that game with 32 points, while Howell had 31 points and 21 rebounds. More importantly, it was their second straight win. For those performances, he won an unanimous Player of the Week award. In the Governors' Cup, he had a foot injury. But he was able to play in Phoenix's final game, in which he hit a tough corner three with 1.2 seconds remaining to beat Blackwater. He dedicated the game-winner to retiring veterans Kramer and Willy Wilson.

2020 season: Bubble season 
On September 17, the PBA Board of Governors have approved a plan to restart the season on October 11 (originally on October 9), then was given a provisional approval by the Inter-Agency Task Force for the Management of Emerging Infectious Diseases (IATF-EID) on September 24. All games were played in the "PBA bubble" in Angeles City, the isolation zone specifically created for league operations. Before the start of the season, interim coach Topex Robinson was made permanent head coach. In the first game of the 2020 Philippine Cup, he scored 36 points in a win over the Bolts. He dedicated that performance to his late childhood idol Kobe Bryant and to coach Robinson. He then followed up that with 23 points, seven rebounds, and nine assists in a win over NorthPort. Against Magnolia, he scored 23 points to help Phoenix overcome a 23-point deficit. In the return of Abueva after a 16-month ban against NLEX, he scored 28 points. He continued his high-scoring with 33 points in a win against the Terrafirma Dyip. He cooled down with just 10 points against SMB, but RJ Jazul's career-high of 33 points gave Phoenix the win. He also had 10 assists. At the end of the elimination round, he emerged as a leading MVP candidate, leading the league in statistical points and leading Phoenix to the 2nd seed. They beat Magnolia in the quarterfinals, as he hit a game-winning three point shot off the bench. However, in Game 1 of the semifinals against TNT, he injured his ankle. He decided to play through the pain, as he played limited minutes in Game 2. In Game 3, he had 23 points, including a turnaround jumper that sealed the win and moved them one more win closer to the Finals. But TNT won the next two games, with TNT guard Bobby Ray Parks Jr. scoring 36 and 26 points on them, eliminating Phoenix from finals contention. At the end of the season, he was awarded a spot on the PBA's Elite Five. He also finished second in Best Player of the Conference voting, losing it to Barangay Ginebra's Stanley Pringle.

2021 season 
Wright scored 20 points in a loss to the Hotshots, now having Abueva, who had been acquired by them in the offseason before the 2021 Philippine Cup. He missed a game due to a sprained ankle, but Phoenix still won that game with Vic Manuel stepping up with 26 points and 12 rebounds. Following a league-imposed break, him and Manuel led the league in scoring, but had only one win to four losses up to that point. They got their second win against Rain or Shine when Wright made his only field goal of the game in the last 2.6 seconds of the game to put them up for good. He did contribute 12 rebounds and five assists. In the end, they were eliminated from playoff contention when they lost to Ginebra. In the Governors' Cup, he got another Player of the Week award after scoring 23 points in a Christmas Day win over NLEX. It was also during this time that he got offers to play in the Japanese B-League. For the period of February 11–13, he earned another Player of the Week award after scoring 27 points,10 assists, and the game-winning steal in a win over TNT. They secured the last spot for the playoffs with a win over NorthPort. At the end of the elimination round, he was no. 2 in statistical points, putting him in the running for Best Player of the Conference. Phoenix was eliminated in a blowout loss by Magnolia, in which he fouled out. He also admitted frustration with Phoenix losing key players to trades and free agency.

2022–23 season 
Wright began talks on contract negotiations with Phoenix, keeping his options open on playing overseas. They failed however, to reach an agreement before the start of the season. Phoenix also tried trading him, but no takers were found. With the contract set to expire at the end of the 2022 Philippine Cup, he decided to play out the contract and set aside negotiations as not to distract the team. On the opening day of the league, he was made a member of the Second Mythical Team for the previous season. He began his season with 20 points in a loss to SMB. In Phoenix's penultimate game of the conference, he had 15 points, eight rebounds, and four assists to lead them in a rout over the Converge FiberXers. It was revealed that he had to leave for the US to marry his wife, and would not finish the conference. He mentioned that it could possibly be his last game with the team, as both him and Phoenix failed to reach a compromise in contract negotiations. He also mentioned that playing overseas or returning to the PBA with a different teams were options he was considering. In Phoenix's final game of the conference, they lost to Ginebra without him.

Kyoto Hannaryz (2022–present) 
On August 31, 2022, Wright announced that he had officially parted ways with Phoenix. On September 2, Kyoto Hannaryz of the Japanese B.League announced that they had signed him to a two-year deal (with the second year a team option). The contract came with perks and a clause that would allow him to play for the national team. The move reunited him with head coach Roy Rana, who was a rival head coach back when he was still in high school.

In Wright's B.League debut, he was scoreless, which was a loss to the Sendai 89ers. Despite a back injury, he played in their rematch the following day, contributing five points as the team bounced back with the win. He then missed back-to-back games against the Nagoya Flying Eagles. He returned with 10 points, but his team still lost to SeaHorses Mikawa. In the rematch, the team snapped their three-game losing streak, with him contributing eight points and four assists. Against Niigata Albirex, he had his best game yet with 16 points, five rebounds and three assists. He got to play in the Asia Rising Star game during the B.League's All-Star Weekend. In the first game after All-Star Weekend, he had 13 points and seven rebounds in a win over the Osaka Evessa. Against the Hiroshima Dragonflies, he scored a season-high 26 points and eight assists, but lost and slid to a 16–24 record.

National team career

Junior national team
Wright was part of the Philippines men's national under-18 team coached by Franz Pumaren that competed in the four-nation Nokia Manila Youth Basketball Invitational 2008 and 2008 FIBA Asia Under-18 Championship. He was convinced by fellow Fil-Canadian Norbert Torres to join the team.

Senior national team
In 2016, he was included in the pool of the Philippine men's senior national team where the members of the Philippine squad that participated at the 2016 FIBA Asia Challenge was derived from.

The following year, Wright was on the team for the 2017 SEABA Championship, and he won a gold medal. He was also on the roster for that year's FIBA Asia Cup, and scored 25 points in a win over Qatar to clinch the top spot in Group B. However, Gilas only finished in seventh place after making back-to-back second place finishes. He contributed 12 points (including a perfect 7-of-7 from the free throw line) in a win over Japan for the 2019 FIBA World Cup qualifiers.

In 2018, he was involved in the Philippines–Australia basketball brawl, as he was among nine Filipino players ejected from the game. As a result, him and Japeth Aguilar had to serve a one-game suspension, which was the least punishment among players involved. They were able to make their return in a qualifying game against Qatar.

For the final World Cup qualifiers in 2019, Wright was not included in the lineup. Still, Gilas qualified for the World Cup with a win over Kazakhstan. He returned to the Gilas pool for the World Cup, but experienced pains in his ankle. His ankle got better, but in the end, he was one of the final cuts from the final roster for the World Cup. He was able to win a gold medal in the 2019 SEA Games.

Wright begged off from the Gilas Pilipinas pool for the first window of the Fiba Asia Cup qualifiers due to rehab for an ankle injury. In 2022, he returned to Gilas for the 2021 SEA Games. Unlike last time, Gilas was denied its gold medal by Indonesia in the finals.

Personal life
As of 2017, he is involved in a long-distance relationship with Gabriela Moscoso. They have two sons, Preston and Roman. They married on July 24, 2022.

He grew up in Toronto with his grandmother, mother, and some relatives.

Wright has cited Vince Carter and Kobe Bryant as his influences growing up.

Career statistics

International

Season-by-season averages 

|-
| align=center | 2014–15
| align=left | Quimper
| LNB Pro B
| 16 || 23.9 || .403 || .343 || .649 || 1.7 || 2.2 || 1.4 || .1 || 9.8
|-
| align=center | 2015–16
| align=left | Westports Malaysia Dragons
| ABL
| 27 || 34.8 || .453 || .425 || .740 || 4.1 || 3.0 || 2.0 || .2 || 21.2
|-
|-class=sortbottom
| align="center" colspan=2 | Career
| All Leagues
| 43 || 30.9 || .442 || .404 || .715 || 3.2 || 2.7 || 1.8 || .1 || 17.0

PBA 

As of the end of 2022–23 season

Season-by-season averages 

|-
| align=left | 
| align=left | Phoenix
| 26 || 32.9 || .363 || .336 || .788 || 6.1 || 3.7 || 1.1 || .0 || 16.5 
|-
| align=left | 
| align=left | Phoenix
| 35 || 33.1 || .405 || .343 || .748 || 4.8 || 4.5 || 1.4 || .1 || 17.6
|-
| align=left | 
| align=left | Phoenix
| 37 || 33.0 || .380 || .343 || .844 || 4.2 || 4.4 || 1.4 || .1 || 18.9
|-
| align=left | 
| align=left | Phoenix
| 17 || 37.2 || .446 || .394 || .802 || 4.4 || 5.5 || 1.2 || .0 || 21.1
|-
| align=left | 
| align=left | Phoenix
| 24 || 37.1 || .357 || .282 || .796 || 5.8 || 6.4 || 1.6 || .1 || 16.3
|-
| align=left | 
| align=left | Phoenix
| 10 || 34.9 || .342 || .297 || .750 || 5.1 || 5.9 || 1.6 || .0 || 15.3
|-class=sortbottom
| align="center" colspan=2 | Career
| 149 || 34.3 || .384 || .336 || .798 || 5.0 || 4.9 || 1.4 || .1 || 17.8

NCAA

|-
| align="left" | 2010–11
| align="left" rowspan="4" | St. Bonaventure University
| 31 || 0 || 16.2 || .386 || .317 || .846 || 1.9 || 1.6 || .8 || .1 || 4.7
|-
| align="left" | 2011–12
| 32 || 18 || 27.3 || .351 || .317 || .778 || 2.5 || 2.8 || .9 || .3 || 6.8
|-
| align="left" | 2012–13
| 26 || 21 || 23.8 || .430 || .306 || .813 || 1.7 || 2.0 || .8 || .1 || 7.3
|-
| align="left" | 2013–14
| 32 || 31 || 34.9 || .409 || .362 || .861 || 3.1 || 3.2 || 1.1 || .1 || 16.3
|- class="sortbottom"
| style="text-align:center;" colspan="2"| Career
|| 121 || 70 || 25.7 || .396 || .333 || .839 || 2.3 || 2.4 || .9 || .1 || 8.9

References

External links

 Matthew Wright on Instagram

1991 births
Living people
Basketball players from Toronto
Canadian expatriate basketball people in France
Canadian expatriate basketball people in the United States
Canadian men's basketball players
Canadian sportspeople of Filipino descent
Citizens of the Philippines through descent
Competitors at the 2019 Southeast Asian Games
Competitors at the 2021 Southeast Asian Games
Filipino expatriate basketball people in Japan
Filipino expatriate basketball people in Malaysia
Filipino expatriate basketball people in France
Filipino expatriate basketball people in the United States
Filipino men's basketball players
Kuala Lumpur Dragons players
Kyoto Hannaryz players
Members of Iglesia ni Cristo
Philippine Basketball Association All-Stars
Philippines men's national basketball team players
Phoenix Super LPG Fuel Masters draft picks
Phoenix Super LPG Fuel Masters players
Shooting guards
Small forwards
Southeast Asian Games gold medalists for the Philippines
Southeast Asian Games medalists in basketball
Southeast Asian Games silver medalists for the Philippines
St. Bonaventure Bonnies men's basketball players
UJAP Quimper 29 players